Estadio Olímpico de Ibarra (English: Ibarra Olympic Stadium) is a multi-use stadium in Ibarra, Ecuador.  It is currently used mostly for football matches and is the home stadium of Imbabura Sporting Club of the Serie A de Ecuador. The stadium holds 18,600 spectators and opened in 1988.

References

Olimpico de Ibarra
Buildings and structures in Imbabura Province
1988 establishments in Ecuador
Sports venues completed in 1988